Antipodes Water Company is a New Zealand water-bottling company. It is known for its high-quality water, distinctive bottle and branding, and is only available in restaurants, bars, gourmet food stores and fine wine outlets in seven countries. Antipodes joined the United Nations Environment Programme's Climate Neutral Network and became the world's first premium bottled water company to be certified carbon-neutral. It is owned by Simon Woolley, a well-known restaurateur, and a group of prominent advertising executives.

Water quality
Antipodes water is available in both still and sparkling forms. It comes to the surface at Whakatane, Bay of Plenty, on the northeast coast of New Zealand's North Island. According to one study by the Bay of Plenty Regional Council, “The groundwater of the aquifer is of very high quality. It has been recognized as the deepest, highest quality groundwater in New Zealand.” The water is very pure, with total dissolved solids of 130 mg/litre and 73 mg/litre of silica. The water spends 50 years underground and comes to the surface under its own pressure. It is filtered through a substratum of ignimbrite rock before it comes to the surface and is then micro-filtered again in the plant. It is bottled without any chemical interference (although it does use CO2 for its carbonated water products). The plant operates to international quality standards ISO 9002 and 22000.

Awards
In 2006, Antipodes was named the best-tasting carbonated bottled water by the Berkeley Springs International Water Tasting. In 2012, it won a silver in the carbonated bottled water category at the same awards.

Bottle
The Antipodes bottle is distinctive for being shorter and more bulbous than most water bottles. Its simple shape was inspired by traditional New Zealand sherry or beer flagons, and was intended to be unobtrusive on a table top. Originally the company used German bottles designed for laboratories, which was expensive and meant that most New Zealand bottlers were unable to fit them into their machines. The bottles are now made in New Zealand by O-I glass.

Environmental stance
As well as joining the UN’s Climate Neutral Network, the company has integrated several environmental measures into its business, particularly related to its plant, which it built in 2007. It has developed a wetland and replanted native kahikatea forest on the land surrounding the bottling facility, and has cut its energy use by installing solar panels that heat water for its laboratory and testing facilities. It re-uses wastewater and rinsewater from the bottling is diverted to the wetland. The company uses fuel-efficient vehicles and video conferencing to reduce its carbon footprint, and the bottles are made from 50 percent recycled glass.

References

External links
Antipodes Water Company
Water Delivery Services

Bottled water brands
Whakatāne